Overdrawn (foaled 1939) was an American Thoroughbred racehorse best known for winning three straight editions of the Jamaica Handicap.

For his first two Jamaica Handicap wins, Overdrawn was raced by his breeder George D. Widener Jr. and trained by future U.S. Racing Hall of Fame inductee Bert Mulholland. In late summer of 1942, the four-year-old gelded Overdrawn was sold to the Dearborn Stable of Detroit, owned by James Powers & Morton Donnelly. C. Hyde Smith was the Dearborn Stable's trainer but it would be Pete Battle who was Overdrawn's trainer of record for his third Jamaica Handicap win in 1943. In addition to his Jamaica Handicap success, Overdrawn would win that fall's New Rochelle Handicap at the same track.

While a horse winning three consecutive runnings of any race is a rare feat, in the case of the Jamaica Handicap that happened a second time when Peter Markey's horse Piet won the race in 1949, 1950 and 1951.

References

1939 racehorse births
American racehorses
Racehorses bred in Kentucky
Racehorses trained in the United States
Thoroughbred family 23-b
Widener family